Nazzareno Simonato (born 24 April 1936) is an Italian rower. He competed in the men's eight event at the 1960 Summer Olympics.

References

External links
 

1936 births
Living people
Italian male rowers
Olympic rowers of Italy
Rowers at the 1960 Summer Olympics
Sportspeople from the Province of Padua